Francesca P. Roberts (born December 19, 1953) is an American film and television actress known for playing "Big Bertha" in a live action movie Super Mario Bros. in 1993, as well as Anita Craig in ABC's sitcom TV series Baby Talk, which lasted from 1991 to 1992, and Anna-May in Frank's Place.

Early life and education 
Roberts was born on December 19, 1953 in Los Angeles, California but raised in New Orleans, Louisiana. The daughter of Margaret B. Roberts (née Gross, 1926–2016) and Bobby Ray Louis Roberts Sr., she had two younger sisters Melanie and Bianca, as well as two younger brothers who are now both deceased, Bobby Jr. and Gregory. She attended three colleges: University of New Orleans, Southern Illinois University and L'École de Mime Jacques LeCoq, where she has also studied in New Orleans, Louisiana and Paris, France. She did stage work at the North Hollywood's Group Repertory Theatre, New Orleans' Free Southern Theatre, Reseda Megaw Theatre, and with Hollywood's Touchstone Group.

Roberts is a graduate of Mount Carmel Academy.

Career 
Roberts was originally involved in stage work before appearing on TV.

Roberts made her first television appearance in Starsky & Hutch in 1979, only appearing in a minor role. Then she later moved on to make her debut film appearance in Inside Moves (1980), starring John Savage. She would continue on by making numerous TV guest appearances that had main or minor roles, in the likes of Private Benjamin, a show that was based on the film with the same name (1980), Fame, The Facts of Life, Frank's Place and Baby Talk. She would appear in movies, such as the 1993 live-action movie based on the Mario video game series, Super Mario Bros. (1993), playing as "Big Bertha", a bouncer of the Boom Boom Bar, Legally Blonde (2001) as judge "Marina R. Bickford", and Heart of Dixie (1989) as "Keefi". She frequently appears in film or TV, playing characters for only just a minimum time.

In 1994, Roberts appeared on Martin, playing as "Judge Wheatley" in two episodes, "No Justice, No Peace" & "Crunchy Drawers" (Season 2).

Roberts usually plays characters who are courtroom judges in movies or TV.

Filmography

References

External links 
 

1953 births
Living people
American stage actresses
African-American actresses
Actresses from New Orleans
University of New Orleans alumni
Southern Illinois University alumni
21st-century African-American people
20th-century African-American people
20th-century African-American women
21st-century African-American women